Patrick Stanfield Jones is an American musician, producer, arranger, and singer-songwriter whose music is a mix of rock, jazz, folk, and blues.

He is a brother of jazz percussionist Kevin Jones, and they have performed and recorded together. He has worked with Isley, Jasper, Isley and Whitney Houston. He has been a member of the touring casts of Jesus Christ Superstar and Oh, Calcutta!. He performed the music of Ned Rorem's song cycle Songs of Sadness, and Romeo and Juliet at Merkin recital hall in Manhattan on April 24, 2005.  He has performed on more than 20 albums.

Jones' solo CDs include A Heart and an Open Road (Motéma Music, 2011), Pat Jones Band (1995), and the EP Mystery Prize (2004).

He has been compared to Carl Perkins, but with a more modern sensibility.

Band
 Drummer David McMillen 
 Bassist Joe Riccio
 Saxophonist Colin Pohl

References

External links
 Official site

Place of birth missing (living people)
Year of birth missing (living people)
Living people
American country guitarists
American rockabilly guitarists
American male singer-songwriters
American male guitarists
Motéma Music artists
American singer-songwriters